"Million-dollar wound" (American English) or "Blighty wound" (British English) is military slang for a type of wound received in combat which is serious enough to get the soldier sent away from the fighting, but neither fatal nor permanently crippling.

Description
In his World War II memoir With the Old Breed, Eugene Sledge wrote that during the Battle of Okinawa, the day after he tried to reassure a fellow United States Marine who believed he would soon die,

A similar concept is the Blighty (a slang term for Britain or England) wound, a British reference from World War I.

In popular culture
In the film adaptation of Forrest Gump, the titular character receives a gunshot to his backside during his service in the Vietnam War, which leaves him sidelined from combat for months (ultimately serving as the end of his combat service, but for unrelated reasons). Due to Gump's below-average intelligence, he takes the expression "million dollar wound" literally, saying: "the Army must keep that money, 'cause I still ain't seen a nickel of that million dollars".

References

Injuries
Military slang and jargon
Military humor
War casualties